The Parliamentary Under-Secretary of State for Justice is a junior position in the Ministry of Justice in the British Government.

Parliamentary Under-Secretaries of State for Justice

References

Ministerial positions in the Government of the United Kingdom